Dipteropeltis hirundo is a little-known species of fish louse. It is an ectoparasite of fish found in South America, including piranhas and barred sorubim.

References

External links 

Freshwater crustaceans of South America
Monotypic arthropod genera
Ectoparasites
Animal parasites of fish
Parasitic crustaceans